Diceratura porrectana is a species of moth of the family Tortricidae. It is found in Transcaucasia and Golestan Province, Iran.

References

Moths described in 1929
Cochylini